Mercurius Hranno is a Germanic god, who is only occupied by a dedicatory inscription from the 2nd to 3rd century in Bornheim - Hümmerich. The Germanic nickname is associated with the Old Norse Odin legume Hrani in and out of him, that was worshiped by the dedicatory inscription of the Germanic Wodan / Odin by resident Ubii. Hranno means "rough guy, polterer" and alludes to a trait of the common Germanic god.

Discovery
In Hümmerich, in the first half of the 1980s, a heavily damaged Mercurius statuette was plowed up during field work and initially deposited unnoticed on the edge of the field. In 1984 they recognized the epigraphic and archaeological value of the piece and handed it over to the Rheinisches Landesmuseum Bonn for private research. The statuette is equipped with a pedestal bearing the inscription.

The statuette made from Lorraine's Jurassic limestone is broken off in the middle of the lower leg and today has a total height of 79 cm, whereby the proportion of the 31.2 cm deep base including the cornices is 58.8 cm. The back of the base is severely damaged today and was once only roughly smoothed. On the sides of the base, a crater with s-shaped handles is shown in each case, from the mouths of the crater entwines ornamental foliage. From the fragmentary Mercurius statuette in the manner of an aediculathe lower legs are severely damaged - especially the left lower leg or the foot -, where the right leg is shown as a mainstay. On preserved pictorial equipment a turtle is recognizable on the left foot, on which stood a cock, whose tail feathers on the left calf have been preserved. Between the legs of Mercurius there is an angular object, which was probably once continued to the head of the statuette and showed an arrow- or spear-like object. In general, the execution is inconspicuous, iconographically deviates from other representations of Mercurius in the Germania Inferior and offers a frequent element especially in the motive of the companion animals of the turtle and the rooster. Due to the finds of other Mercurius consecration stones in Bornheim district Sechtem is considered in the research of the place as a sanctuary for Mercurius. It follows that the Mercurius-Hranno statuette was also originally placed in this sanctuary and was later deported to the site in Hemmerich. The stone is owned by the city of Bornheim, a casting is owned by the Rheinisches Landesmuseum Bonn.

Inscription
On the front of the pedestal, in six lines on the approximately 43 cm × 48.5 cm measuring field, there is the almost intact dedicatory inscription in the usual majuscule for MERCVRIO HRANNON (I). The nickname of the inscription would be to merely a i, expanding to which is interrupted in the second row right konjizieren. Hartmut Galsterer reads the surname as Hrannond (i).

The name of the donor Nigrinia as a derivation of the Gentile name Nigrinius has the peculiarity that this is occupied only in the Gallia Belgica and Germania. The nickname Titul (l) us shows a distribution focus outside the northern provinces with, for example, 35 documents in the Gallia Narbonensis compared to only two documents for the Gallia Belgica and both Germania together. Unusually, the formula becomes ex visu monita - too German for attention (or look) of the warning- evaluated, as it is the first document for the Lower Germanic province and it is generally rare with three documents in the northwest (two documents in the Belgica, one document in the Germania superior).

Surname
The striking nickname of Mercurius can be produced from the inscriptional dative form to the nominative Hranno. The Graphie Germanic hr- leads phonetically indogermanisch kr- continued; characterized that the name is undoubtedly represents a Germanic. After the usual Interpretatio Romana therefore be assumed that this Mercury Germanic * Wōðanaz, Odin / Odin represents. To clarify the epithet Norbert Wagner draws different evidence from the Germanic name treasure.

First, he refers to the Odinsbeinamen, in the specific case as a cover name. In the Fornaldarsaga of Hrólfs saga kraka, Odin performs disguised as a farmer named Hrani. The traditional today Hrolfs saga from the 14th century is a revised version of a much older template. The document from the saga can be put to other personal names and place names of early to high medieval Scandinavia. Basically Hrani has in the Old Norse language as well as in the new Icelandic the range of meaning of "polterer, rough man and braggart", thus with appellative character. A derived adjectival form is hranalegr with the meaning of "harsh, rough, ruthless". It follows that in Old Norse the name of the Odin is an appellative.

An older document attracts Wagner with the ethnonym Hronum, Old English Dative plural to Nominative Plural Hronan, in the passage verse 63 of Widsith. Hronan has the meaning of "the rough, the rough, the polterer".

The inscriptional Hranno as well as the Old Norse Hrani both have a masculine n-stem, a difference exists only in -nn- to -n- , and show a familiar form, as it appears in other masculine n-strains in Germanic, such as Old High German scarce from knabbo to knabo - a difference that is not to be defined in meaning, but in expression. Wagner thus sees the meaning of the written form clarified on the linguistic level.

Norbert Wagner and Günter Neumann emphasize the significance of this nickname, which emphasizes the essence or an aspect of Wodan / Odin, which receives an early support from the Western continental Germania for the much later transmitted form from the saga literature through the inscription document. Neumann sees in Hranno the repeatedly observed phenomenon that the north of the Germania was much more conservative and thus repeatedly provides conclusions and evidence that have passed in the West Germanic dialect space. The question as to why a woman has offered veneration to this explicitly masculine deity remains, depending on the fund, presumably still unclear.

References

Germanic gods
Names of Odin